English family law concerns the law relating to family matters in England and Wales. Family law concerns a host of authorities, agencies and groups which participate in or influence the outcome of private disputes or social decisions involving family law. Such a view of family law may be regarded as assisting the understanding of the context in which the law works and to indicate the policy areas where improvements can be made.

The UK is made up of three jurisdictions: Scotland, Northern Ireland, and England and Wales. Each has quite different systems of family law and courts. This article concerns only England and Wales. Family law encompasses divorce, adoption, wardship, child abduction and parental responsibility. It can either be public law or private law. Family law cases are heard in the Family Justice System of England and Wales in both county courts and family proceedings courts (magistrates' court), both of which operate under codes of Family Procedure Rules. There is also a specialist division of the High Court of Justice, the Family Division which hears family law cases.

Family relationships

Marriage and civil partnership

Civil Partnerships Act 2004
Marriage (Same Sex Couples) Act 2013

Divorce and dissolution
Matrimonial Causes Act 1973
Children Act 1989
Child Support Act 1990
Divorce, Dissolution and Separation Act 2020

Domestic violence
Family Law Act 1996
Protection from Harassment Act 1997
Children Act 1989

Property rights

Trusts of the family home

Property on separation

Children

Parental responsibility
Human Rights Act 1998

Child's upbringing

Children's rights

Child protection

Adoption

See also
English law

Case law
Decisions of the Court of Appeal may be issued orally, in which case no report is usually made available to the public. Important or difficult decisions, however, are published on the internet both by the Court Service and by the British and Irish Legal Information Institute. The cases cited here provide examples.
Munby judgment: F v M Re D (Intractable Contact Dispute: Publicity) [2004] EWHC 727 (Fam)
Wall judgment: A v A (Shared Residence, 4 February 2004)
Bracewell judgment: V v V (Change of Residence, 20 April 2004)
Butler-Sloss: D v D (Shared Residence Order, 20 November 2000)
Re F (2003) EWCA Civ 592, 18 March 2003. (Case of shared residency, father in Hampshire, mother moved to Edinburgh)
 Miller v Miller (Short marriage, no children, rich husband)
 Piglowska v. Piglowski (Runaway costs)
 Clayton v Clayton 2006 (An appeal against injunctions preventing a father from publishing matters concerning his daughter. The appeal was allowed, the injunction quashed and a Prohibited Steps Order imposed.)

Statutory Instruments
Statutory Instruments contain the rules that lay down court procedure. They frequently cross-reference each other, though many refer to the original 1991 rules, which came in with the Children Act 1989. The list below contains many of the Statutory Instruments that have a bearing on family law, which are available from the Office of Public Sector Information.
The Family Proceedings Rules 1991 Statutory Instrument 1991 No. 1247 (L.20)
The Family Proceedings Courts (Matrimonial Proceedings etc.) Rules 1991 Statutory Instrument 1991 No. 1991 (L.32)
The Family Proceedings (Amendment) Rules 1992 Statutory Instrument 1992 No. 456 (L.1)
The Family Proceedings Courts (Child Support Act 1991) Rules 1993 Statutory Instrument 1993 No. 627 (L. 8)
The Family Proceedings (Amendment) (No. 3) Rules 1994 Statutory Instrument 1994 No. 2890 (L.17)
The Family Proceedings Fees (Amendment) Order 1997 Statutory Instrument 1997 No. 788 (L. 18)
The Family Proceedings (Miscellaneous Amendments) Rules 1999 Statutory Instrument 1999 No. 1012 (L. 9)
The Family Proceedings (Amendment No. 2) Rules 1999 Statutory Instrument 1999 No. 3491 (L. 28)
The Magistrates' Courts (Transfer of Justices' Clerks' Functions) (Miscellaneous Amendments) Rules 2001 Statutory Instrument 2001 No. 615
The Family Proceedings Courts (Family Law Act 1986) Rules 2001 Statutory Instrument 2001 No. 778 (L. 14)
The Family Proceedings (Amendment) Rules 2001 Statutory Instrument 2001 No. 821 (L. 18)
The Legal Aid in Family Proceedings (Remuneration) (Amendment No. 2) Regulations 2001 Statutory Instrument 2001 No. 1255
The Family Proceedings (Amendment) Rules 2003 Statutory Instrument 2003 No. 184 (L. 2)
The Courts Act 2003 (Consequential Amendments) Order 2004 Statutory Instrument 2004 No. 2035
The Family Proceedings (Amendment No. 2) Rules 2003 Statutory Instrument 2003 No. 2839 (L. 35)
The Family Proceedings Fees (Amendment) Order 2003 Statutory Instrument 2003 No. 645 (L. 12)
The Family Proceedings Fees (Amendment No. 2) Order 2003 Statutory Instrument 2003 No. 719 (L. 19)
The Family Proceedings Fees Order 2004 Statutory Instrument 2004 No. 3114 (L. 21)
The Community Legal Service (Funding) (Counsel in Family Proceedings) (Amendment) Order 2005 Statutory Instrument 2005 No. 184
The Family Proceedings (Amendment) Rules 2005 Statutory Instrument 2005 No. 264
The Data Protection (Subject Access Modification) (Social Work) (Amendment) Order 2005 Statutory Instrument 2005 No. 467
The Family Proceedings (Amendment No. 3) Rules 2005 Statutory Instrument 2005 No. 559 (L. 11)
The Family Proceedings (Amendment No 4) Rules 2005 Statutory Instrument 2005 No. 1976 (L. 18 )
The Family Proceedings Courts (Miscellaneous Amendments) Rules 2005 Statutory Instrument 2005 No. 1977 (L. 19)
The Family Procedure (Adoption) Rules 2005 Statutory Instrument 2005 No. 2795 (L. 22)
The Family Proceedings (Civil Partnership: Staying of Proceedings) Rules 2005 Statutory Instrument 2005 No. 2921 (L. 25)
The Family Proceedings (Amendment) (No. 5) Rules 2005 Statutory Instrument 2005 No. 2922 (L. 26)
The Civil Partnership (Family Proceedings and Housing Consequential Amendments) Order 2005 Statutory Instrument 2005 No. 3336
The Family Proceedings Fees (Amendment No. 2) Order 2005 Statutory Instrument 2005 No. 3443 (L.29)

Notes

References
J Herring et al. (eds), Landmark Cases in Family Law (2011)

External links